Gornja Trepča is a village and spa located in the municipality of Čačak, Serbia. As of 2011 census, the village has a population of 556 inhabitants. The Atomska Banja spa center is located in the village; it has waters rich in sulfur and sodium infused with traces of uranium and radon.

See also
 List of spa towns in Serbia

References

External links

Populated places in Moravica District